Leave It to Beaver is a 1957-1963 American television situation comedy.

It may also refer to:
Leave It to Beaver (film), a 1997 film based on the television show
"Leave It to Beaver" (Veronica Mars), an episode of the television show Veronica Mars
 Leave It to Beavers, an episode of the supernatural drama television series Grimm